UB44 is the third studio album of original material by UB40, released on the DEP International label in 1982. It was advertised as their 'fourth album' (hence the title) although Present Arms in Dub had been a remix album. The album reached No. 4 in the UK album chart and the early release of the packaging had a hologram cover. UB44 was the Department of Employment form letter sent to British unemployment benefit claimants when they missed their 'signing on' appointment.

Releases 
The album was initially released on LP and cassette. A CD reissue followed in 1993. Some releases incorrectly state that the album was recorded in 1981.

Content
This album was effectively the last one in their early musical style, again mixing heavy, doom-laden reggae soundscapes with politically and socially conscious lyrics. In particular, "I Won't Close My Eyes" and "Love is All is Alright" use reverb, echoes, and stereo positioning for a shimmering, three dimensional feel indicated by the 3D cover.  Droning rhythms- the 4th dimension of time- induce a trance, evoking reggae's substance behind the muse.  "Love is All is Alright" is a slow number with close sounding, harmonised vocals.  Sax and trumpet echo in a huge hall, sounding like some Caribbean band of long ago.  A funky, effected, simple guitar twang adds to the old and new feel.  The lyrics challenge the listener that "a little more hate" may be needed in polarised racial and class conflicts.

Track listing
All tracks composed by UB40
"So Here I Am" – 3:54
"I Won't Close My Eyes" [Remix] – 3:46
"Forget the Cost" – 4:22
"Love Is All Is Alright" [Remix] – 4:57
"The Piper Calls the Tune" – 3:50
"The Key" – 5:05
"Don't Do the Crime" – 4:12
"Folitician [Remix]" – 4:10
"The Prisoner" – 5:57

Personnel 
UB40
 Ali Campbell - vocals, guitar
 Astro - trumpet, vocals, toasting
 Brian Travers - saxophone
 Robin Campbell - guitar, vocals
 Michael Virtue - keyboards
 Earl Falconer - bass
 James "Jim" Brown - drums, vocals, synthesized percussion
 Norman Hassan - percussion, trombone
Technical
Rafe McKenna - assistant producer, mixing engineer
Paul Thomas - recording engineer
Optec Design - artwork, hologram

References

1982 albums
UB40 albums